The women's 1000 metres race of the 2014–15 ISU Speed Skating World Cup 4, arranged in the Thialf arena in Heerenveen, Netherlands, was held on 13 December 2014.

Heather Richardson of the United States won, followed by Brittany Bowe of the United States in second place, and Li Qishi of China in third place. Ayaka Kikuchi of Japan won Division B.

Results
The race took place on Saturday, 13 December, with Division B scheduled in the morning session, at 09:30, and Division A scheduled in the afternoon session, at 14:00.

Division A

Division B

References

Women 1000
4